Scarlet Thread is a 1951 British drama film directed by Lewis Gilbert and produced by Ernest G. Roy.

Plot
Two criminals plan a jewellery robbery. The robbery goes wrong and an innocent man is shot.

Cast
 Kathleen Byron as Josephine
 Laurence Harvey as Freddie
 Sydney Tafler as Marcon
 Arthur Hill as Shaw
 Dora Bryan as Maggie
 Eliot Makeham as Jason
 Harry Fowler as Sam
 Cyril Chamberlain as Mason
 Renee Kelly as Eleanor
 Hylton Allen as The Dean

Production
The film was made at Nettlefold Studios, Walton-on-Thames in Surrey, England, and on location. A collection of location stills and corresponding contemporary photographs is hosted at reelstreets.com.

References

External links

1951 films
Films directed by Lewis Gilbert
Films set in London
Films set in Cambridge
British crime drama films
1951 crime drama films
Films produced by Ernest G. Roy
British black-and-white films
Films shot in Cambridgeshire
1950s English-language films
1950s British films